Dubravica may refer to:

 Dubravica, Zagreb County, a village and municipality in Croatia
 Dubravica, Požarevac, a village near Požarevac, Serbia
 Dubravica, Čapljina, a village near Čupljina, Bosnia and Herzegovina
 Dubravica, Neum, a village near Neum, Bosnia and Herzegovina
 Dubravica, Vitez, a village near Vitez, Bosnia and Herzegovina
 Dubravica, Zavidovići, a village near Zavidovići, Bosnia and Herzegovina
 Dúbravica, a village and a municipality in Slovakia
 Dubravica, Dubrovnik, a village near Dubrovnik, Croatia
 Dubravica, Metković, a village near Metković, Croatia

See also
 
 Dubrava (disambiguation)